Roman Olehovych Popov (born 29 June 1995) is a Ukrainian footballer who plays as a right-back.

Popov is product of MFC Mykolaiv youth team system. His first trainer was Serhiy Burymenko.

He made his debut for Metalurh Zaporizhzhia in the Ukrainian Premier League in a match against FC Dynamo Kyiv on 30 May 2015.

References

External links
 
 

1995 births
Living people
Sportspeople from Mykolaiv
Ukrainian footballers
Association football defenders
MFC Mykolaiv players
FC Metalurh Zaporizhzhia players
FC Zirka Kropyvnytskyi players
FC Chornomorets Odesa players
Ukrainian Premier League players
Ukrainian First League players
Ukrainian Second League players